Children's Library is a collection of digitized books at the Internet Archive. These books are from the University of California Libraries, the University of Florida's "Literature for Children" Collection, National Yiddish Book Center, New York Public Library, International Children's Digital Library and some libraries that sponsored books to Internet Archive. This collection contains many free historical ebooks for children.

See also
 American Libraries
 Canadian Libraries

References

External links
 

Internet Archive collections
Children's libraries